Phulabani Odia/Phulbani Odia (ଫୁଲବାଣୀ ଓଡିଆ), is a minor dialect of Odia language spoken in Phulbani, Khajuripada block, Phiringia Block of Kandhamal and parts of Boudh district. The Odia spoken form of Phulbani & Boudh is influenced by the tribal language like Kui & also by Kalahandia Odia. It is inclined more towards Standard Odia variety.

Here are few of the typical Phulbani Odia words and their synonyms in standard Odia:

References

Eastern Indo-Aryan languages
Languages of Odisha
Odia language